This Is Ray Brown is a 1958 studio album by American jazz double bass player Ray Brown.

Track listing
 "Bric-A-Brac" (Ray Brown) – 5:33
 "Upstairs Blues" (Brown) – 6:40
 "(Back Home Again in) Indiana" (James F. Hanley, Ballard MacDonald) – 4:38
 "The Nearness of You" (Hoagy Carmichael, Ned Washington) – 6:16
 "Take the "A" Train" (Billy Strayhorn) – 8:06
 "Cool Walk" (Brown) – 6:31
 "Jim" (Caesar Petrillo, Milton Samuels, Nelson Shawn) – 9:00

Personnel

Performance
Ray Brown – double bass
Jerome Richardson – flute
Oscar Peterson – organ, piano
Herb Ellis – guitar
Osie Johnson – drums

References

1958 albums
Ray Brown (musician) albums
Albums produced by Norman Granz
Verve Records albums